The mixed doubles tournament of the 2021 BWF World Championships took place from 12 to 19 December 2021 at the Palacio de los Deportes Carolina Marín at Huelva.

Seeds

The seeding list is based on the World Rankings of 23 November 2021.

 Zheng Siwei / Huang Yaqiong (second round)
 Dechapol Puavaranukroh / Sapsiree Taerattanachai (champions)
 Yuta Watanabe / Arisa Higashino (final)
 Praveen Jordan / Melati Daeva Oktavianti (withdrew)
 Tang Chun Man / Tse Ying Suet (semi-finals)
 Marcus Ellis / Lauren Smith (second round)
 Chan Peng Soon / Goh Liu Ying (withdrew)
 Thom Gicquel / Delphine Delrue (third round)
 Tan Kian Meng / Lai Pei Jing (third round)
 Goh Soon Huat / Shevon Jemie Lai (quarter-finals)
 Mark Lamsfuß / Isabel Lohau (quarter-finals)
 Mathias Christiansen / Alexandra Bøje (third round)
 Yuki Kaneko / Misaki Matsutomo (quarter-finals)
 Robin Tabeling / Selena Piek (third round)
 Rinov Rivaldy / Pitha Haningtyas Mentari (withdrew)
 Rodion Alimov / Alina Davletova (quarter-finals)

Draw

Finals

Top half

Section 1

Section 2

Bottom half

Section 3

Section 4

References

2021 BWF World Championships